Elephantid betaherpesvirus 4 (ElHV-4) is a species of virus in the genus Proboscivirus, subfamily Betaherpesvirinae, family Herpesviridae, and order Herpesvirales.

References 

Betaherpesvirinae